Carex sheldonii is a species of sedge known by the common name Sheldon's sedge.

Description
Carex sheldonii produces triangular stems up to a meter tall from a network of rhizomes. The narrow, hairy leaves attach to the stems by reddish purple sheaths. The inflorescence is a solid, narrow cluster of flowers up to 50 centimeters long, holding up to 100 developing fruits.

Distribution and habitat
This sedge is native to the Western United States, where it grows in wet areas such as lakeshores and moist meadows.

References

External links
Jepson Manual Treatment - Carex sheldonii
USDA Plants Profile: Carex sheldonii
Carex sheldonii - Photo gallery

sheldonii
Flora of the Western United States
Flora of California
Flora of Nevada
Flora of Oregon
Flora of the Sierra Nevada (United States)
Plants described in 1915
Flora without expected TNC conservation status